Capranica Prenestina is a comune (municipality) in the Metropolitan City of Rome in the Italian region Lazio, located about  east of Rome.

It is located in the Monti Prenestini area.

References

External links
 Official website

Cities and towns in Lazio